Dolores Partido is a  partido in the eastern part of Buenos Aires Province in Argentina. It borders the partidos of Castelli, Tordillo, Maipú, General Guido and Pila.

Settlements
Dolores (pop. 24,120)
Sevigne (pop. 286)
Paraje Los Sauquitos
Paraje Parravicini
Paraje Sol de Mayo

History
1806 at the end of the Spanish colonial times, the countryside of Buenos Aires extended north of the Salado River, protected against the natives by forts. The few populated towns, near its right bank, were starting to encroach the vast territories of the native people, who lived in great numbers near Samborombón Bay. To the south of the Salado, a small fort was built, to provide defense for several ranches in the area.
1817, the area of "Pago de Dolores" is formed.
1821, the natives razed the town, which is rebuilt.
1825, the Monsalvo district is adjoined.
1831, a Justice of the Peace court is opened, separating itself from "Partido de Monsalvo".
1839 the area of the Partido is reduced by a federal decree that divides the area in thirds: Tordillo, Pila and Dolores.
1865, the borders of the Partido are defined.

References

External links

 

Partidos of Buenos Aires Province
States and territories established in 1831